Lomatium thompsonii, commonly known as Thompson's desertparsley, is a perennial herb of the family Apiaceae endemic to Chelan and Kittitas County in Washington, United States. It grows in open, rocky slopes and pine forests. Flowers bloom May to June.

References

thompsonii
Flora of Washington (state)
Endemic flora of the United States
Flora without expected TNC conservation status